European School, Frankfurt am Main, or ESF is a European school in Frankfurt, Germany.

History 
The European School Frankfurt was opened in 2002 and caters for nursery school, primary school, and secondary students.

Approximately 1,600 pupils attend the school. In addition to the four language sections (German, English, French and Italian) of the early years, the Spanish section was opened in September 2018. For the students without a language section (SWALS), apart from Maltese, all languages spoken in the member states of the EU are taught.

See also 
 European Schools

References

External links 
 

Frankfurt am Main
International schools in Hesse
Educational institutions established in 2002
2002 establishments in Germany